The Mariners' Museum and Park is located in Newport News, Virginia, United States. Designated as America’s National Maritime Museum by Congress, it is one of the largest maritime museums in North America. The Mariners' Museum Library, contains the largest maritime history collection in the Western Hemisphere.

History 
The museum was founded in 1930 by Archer Milton Huntington, son of Collis P. Huntington, a railroad builder who brought the Chesapeake and Ohio Railway to Warwick County, Virginia, and who founded the City of Newport News, its coal export facilities, and Newport News Shipbuilding in the late 19th century.

Huntington and his wife Anna acquired  of land that now holds  of exhibition galleries, a research library, a  lake, a five-mile shoreline trail with 14 bridges, and over 35,000 maritime artifacts from around the world. After the land acquisition took place, the first two years were devoted to creating and improving a natural park and constructing a dam to create The Mariners' Lake.

Artifacts, paintings, models 
The museum’s collection totals approximately 32,000 artifacts, equally divided between works of art and three-dimensional objects. The scope of the collection is international and includes miniature ship models, scrimshaw, maritime paintings, decorative arts, carved figureheads, working steam engines, and the world's only known Kratz-built steam calliope. The museum holds important collections of paintings and drawings by marine artists James Bard and Antonio Jacobsen. 

The museum offers educational programs for all ages and a large research library and archives, as well as publications and Internet resources for teachers. The largest boat in its collection is the Oracle Team USA 17, the yacht that won the 2013 America's Cup.

Collection highlights

USS Monitor Center 

The Mariners' Museum is home to the USS Monitor Center. The ironclad Monitor was made famous in the Battle of Hampton Roads in 1862 during the American Civil War, and its remains were located on the floor of the Atlantic Ocean about 16 miles southeast of Cape Hatteras, North Carolina. The wreck site was designated as the United States' first national marine sanctuary, the only one of the 13 national marine sanctuaries created to protect a cultural resource rather than a natural resource or a mix of natural and cultural resources.

Many artifacts from Monitor have been brought to the museum, including her turret, propeller, anchor, engine, and some personal effects of the crew. For several years, they were conserved in special tanks to stabilize the metal. The USS Monitor Center officially opened on March 9, 2007, and displays include a full-scale replica, the original recovered turret, and many artifacts and related items. Current efforts are focused on restoring the engine.

Park and Noland Trail

The Mariners' Museum Park is 550 acres of privately maintained, naturally wooded property that offers visitors a quiet and serene place to walk, run, or picnic. Within the Park is the 167-acre The Mariners' Lake.

Following the shoreline of The Mariners' Lake is the five-mile Noland Trail. Dedicated as a gift from the Noland Family in 1991 and with significant ongoing financial support from the Noland Family, the trail has fourteen bridges, picnic areas, benches, handicap access, and mile markers. Each fall The Mariners' Museum hosts a 10K run on the Noland Trail.

The Mariners’ Museum Park is open daily to the public. Benches at approximately every half-mile offer places of rest along the trail, and views of The Mariners' Lake can be found around every corner.

The famous Lions Bridge, a dam that provides a scenic view of the James River, remains a highlight for visitors—a perfect family gathering place to enjoy the Museum Park. The beauty of the dam is enhanced by several fine pieces of statuary designed by Anna Hyatt Huntington, sculptor and wife of Museum founder Archer Milton Huntington. Four stone lions were mounted on the ends of the parapets of the dam in October 1932. Anna also created and dedicated a monument entitled Conquering the Wild that overlooks the Lions Bridge, the park, and The Mariners' Lake.

See also
 List of maritime museums in the United States
 National Maritime Museums, a list of maritime museums around the world

Notes

References

External links 

USS Monitor Center
The Mariners' Museum Image Collection
The Mariners' Museum Twitter Page
The Mariners' Museum Facebook page

History museums
Institutions accredited by the American Alliance of Museums
Landmarks in Virginia
Maritime museums in Virginia
Military and war museums in Virginia
Museums established in 1930
Museums in Newport News, Virginia
1930 establishments in Virginia
Private congressionally designated national museums of the United States